Misdemeanor is a female stoner rock band from Sweden. Its current members are Vera Olofsson (vocals), Jenny Möllberg (guitar), Jenny Lindahl (bass), Sara Fredriksson (guitar), and  Mia Möllberg (drums). They released their first 4-song self-titled 7" in 1997.

In 1999, Misdemeanor collaborated with ex-Kyuss vocalist John Garcia, who sang the fourth song, Love Song, on their EP, Five Wheel Drive.

External links
 MeteorCity

Discography 

 Misdemeanor EP 7" - Psychout Records (1997)
 Five Wheel Drive EP - MeteorCity (1999)
 You're Nothing (and you know it) /Y.S.B.T. 7" - Freakscene Records (1999)
 Misdemeanor - Muse Entities (2002)
 Let Me Know/The Hard One 7" - Muse Entities (2002)
 High Crimes And Misdemeanor - Muse Entities (2004)

Swedish rock music groups
All-female bands